The Jeep Renegade is a concept car of the American company Jeep. The car was first exhibited at the North American International Auto Show in 2008. The Renegade's main feature is the hybrid engine. The model will remain a study model for the moment and will not be further developed.

Model 

According to Jeep, the Jeep Renegade is made from minimal components, the chassis and the car interior are made from a single piece of aluminum. The floor of the car is designed in such a fashion that any water is immediately discharged outside. The car is reportedly fully recyclable.

Engine  
The Renegade is the first Jeep that has a hybrid drive.

External links  

 Jeep International Website 
 YouTube Video @ 2008 NYC Auto show of Jeep Renegade  

Off-road vehicles 
Renegade